Peeled Snacks is a health food snack company in the U.S. offering organic dried fruits and healthy puff snacks. Based in Gowanus, the company was founded in 2004 by Noha Waibsnaider, who also co-founded the Global Social Venture Competition. She used crowdfunding sites to raise money.

After an ownership change the company moved its headquarters from Brooklyn, New York to Cumberland, Rhode Island.

In March 2021 the company filed for bankruptcy protection, citing losses from the significant decline of sales to schools and airport retailers related to the coronavirus pandemic.

References

Snack food manufacturers of the United States
Certified B Corporations in the Food & Beverage Industry
Companies that filed for Chapter 11 bankruptcy in 2021